James W. Jack Boynton (January 12, 1928 – April 5, 2010) was an American artist.

Biography
Jack Boynton was born in Fort Worth, Texas in 1928. He graduated from Lamar High School in 1945, received Bachelor of Fine Arts (1949) and Master of Fine Arts (1955). He worked as an instructor at University of Houston from 1955–57, San Francisco Art Institute from 1960–62, and as a professor at University of St. Thomas (Texas) from 1969-1985.

He began exhibiting paintings in 1950; has been included in numerous group exhibitions, nationally and internationally, since that time at museums, galleries and universities. Boynton was a key figure in the post-World War II Houston arts scene. According to a Houston Chronicle article written by Douglas Britt, Boynton garnered national attention in the 1950s and 1960s for his modernist, largely abstract paintings.

In 2006 Jack Boynton said:
Artists in Houston in the 50s, 60s and 70s would have been Jim Love, Dick Wray, Herb Mears, Dorothy Hood, Charles Pebworth. Lowell Collins still had status in the 50s, and Henri Gadbois. Mildred Dixon Sherwood had some prominence. Of course, people like Stella Sullivan, you know. Stella was sort of conservative, even then. The 50s was sort of the interim that Jerry MacAgy had big influence, and she had people that were either very enthusiastic about her, or were very negative about her. She didn’t seem to hit the halfway mark. Nobody was indifferent. Then in the 60s I moved to San Francisco, and back in ’62—and somewhere in that interim Sweeney came to town, and Sweeney sort of had sway for a while.

In 2009 Susie Kalil Said:
The term "breakthrough" is often used to denote a major accomplishment of an artist, the works in which he achieves indisputable progress. But what determines a "breakthrough"? What happens when an artist begins a new style? Does he shut off one room before entering another? Or does he extend the space that already exists? Spanning some six decades, Jack Boynton's paintings and works on paper (Lithographs) allow us to measure the way that one person's experiences and sensibility have been expressed in visual impulses. Significantly, Boynton turns arbitrariness into a fine art and does so without sticking to any one approach or medium. Rather, each encounter with a cultural symbol, everyday object or personal memory is reflected in the physical sensuality and structural clarity of his art. Oscillating between past and present, formal elegance and pressurized energy, the exhibition reveals Boynton to be an artist constantly changing and enlarging the sphere in which he functions. Through paintings, Boynton reflects the natural world in order to heighten awareness of our place in the universal.

Jack Boynton and Richard Stout
They arrived in Houston within about eighteen months of each other, Jack Boynton coming first from Fort Worth, freshly out of formal training at TCU. He brought with him the Modernist influences of the Fort Worth circle, and particularly the non-objective "post-circle" tendencies garnered through his association with the likes of Charles Williams, McKie Trotter and others. Richard Stout, a Beaumont native, arrived next. Coming to the city from the venerable Chicago Art Institute, he selected Houston as a home from which to launch a career and to perfect his energetic and dynamic paintings motif. Both young artists quickly set roots in Houston. They found encouragement here and developed a personal collegiality that led them to share a studio together for a time during the late 1950s through the early 1960s.

Exhibitions
1954 Drawings and Paintings by John Biggers and Jack Boynton, (Museum of Fine Arts), Houston, TX; Architectural League, New York, NY
1954 "Younger American Painters." Solomon R. Guggenheim Museum, New York
1957 "Young America," Whitney Museum of American Art, New York
1957,1958 1 of 17 artist representing USA at the Brussels World's Fair
1955 Ft. Worth Art Center (now Museum of Modern Art)  (Solo)
1958, 1959 Barone Gallery, New York City (Solo)
1959 Dallas Museum of Contemporary Art, (Dallas Museum of Art)
1961 "64th American Exhibition Paintings & Sculpture" The Art Institute of Chicago, Chicago
1961 Staempfli Gallery, NYC (Solo)
1962 "Recent Painting: The Figure," Museum of Modern Art, New York
1964 Louisiana Gallery, Houston (Solo)
1966 David Gallery, Houston (Solo)
1968, 1969 Atelier Chapman Kelley, Dallas (Solo
1970 Delgado Museum (now New Orleans Museum of Art. of NO); Simmone Stern Gallery, New Orleans La (Solo)
1971 University of St. Thomas (Texas), Houston  (Solo)
1972 "Landscape Exhibition in Museum Penthouse," Milet Andrejevic, James Jack Boynton, John Button, Christo, Jan Dibbets, Lois Dodd, David Hockney, Yvonne Jacquette, Alex Katz, Gabriel Laderman, Richard Mayhew, Malcolm Morley, Robert Morris, Catherine Murphy, Dennis Oppenheim, Fairfield Porter, Sam Richardson, Edward Ruscha, Robert Smithson, Alan Sonfist, Larry Stark, Pat Steir, Neil Welliver and Ann Wilson. (among other artists) The Museum of Modern Art, New York
1972 Fort Worth Art Center (Now Modern Art Museum of Fort Worth) (Solo)
1974 Du Bose Gallery, Houston  (Solo)
1976 Rice University-Sewall Gallery, Houston, Texas
1976, 1977, 1979, 1982, 1983, 1986 Betty Moody Gallery, Houston (Solo)
1979 University of Houston at Clear Lake City – Houston, Texas (Solo)
1980 “Retrospectrum” Amarillo Art Center, Amarillo Texas and circulating to Texas Museums: Tyler Museum of Art, Art Center of Waco, Abilene Fine Arts Museum (The Grace Museum), and Beaumont Art Museum (Art Museum of Southeast Texas). (retrospective)
1980, 1959 Dord Fitz Gallery, Amarillo (Solo)
1982, 1985, 1986, 1989 William Campbell Contemporary Art, Fort Worth, Texas
1985 "Fresh Paint: The Houston School," Museum of Fine Arts, Houston, Houston
1988 February 10–Mary 15, Texas Art: An exhibition selected from The Menil Collection, The Museum of Fine Arts, Houston and Trustees' Collections of the Contemporary Arts Museum. Artists: John Alexander, David Bates, Forrest Bess, Derek Boshier, Jack Boynton, Mel Chin, Ben L. Culwell, Jeff Delude, Chuck Dugan, Vernon Fisher, Joseph Glasco, Roy Fridge, Bert Long, Jim Love, Ken Luce, David McManaway, Melissa Miller, Gael Stack, Earl Staley, Richard Stout, James Surls, Michael Tracy, Bob Wade, Dick Wray, Richmond Hall, The Menil Collection
1989 “Homecoming:a Thumbnail Retrospective”, Texas Christian University, Fort Worth, Texas (Solo)
1990, 1991 Lynn Goode Gallery, Houston (Solo)
1994 Palomar Cafe, Houston (Solo)
1998 David Dike Gallery, Dallas (Solo)
2002 Gerhard Wurzer Gallery, Houston (Solo)
2005 Tomball College, Texas (Lone Star College–Tomball) (Solo)
2006 Redbud Gallery, Houston (Solo)
2007 "Texas Modern," Martin Museum of Art, Baylor University
2007 "Jack Boynton & Richard Stout. Early works in Houston," William Reaves Fine Art Gallery. Houston
2009 "Six Decades of Jack Boynton," William Reaves Fine Art Gallery. Houston (Solo)
2010 "Dear Houston: Paintings on Envelopes by Jack Boynton and Letters to Artists" by Ron Hartgrove, Hartgrove Galleries, Houston, TX (Solo)

Selected major collections
Solomon R. Guggenheim Museum, New York City
Blanton Museum of Art, University of Texas, Austin
Museum of Fine Arts, Houston, Houston
Dallas Museum of Art
Wadsworth Atheneum of Hartford, Connecticut
Museum of Modern Art, New York City
Modern Art Museum of Fort Worth
Mountain View College, Dallas
Amon Carter Museum, Fort Worth
New Orleans Museum of Art
Tamarind Institute of Lithography Workshop, Albuquerque, NM
Whitney Museum of American Art, New York City
Butler Institute of American Art
Fred Jones Jr. Museum of Art
New Orleans Museum of Art, New Orleans
The Grace Museum
University of Michigan Museum of Art
Oklahoma Art Center, Oklahoma City
(in others as well as many private collections)

List of works
Aftermath '57, oil and sand on canvas, collection Whitney Museum of American Art
Flayed Image, 1959. Oil on canvas 70"x80" framed (70-3/4" x 80-1/2". Private collection
Argonne Forest '69, acrylic on canvas, collection of Oklahoma Art Center, Oklahoma City
Hunchback Rainbow '67, oil on canvas, collection of Mountain View College, Dallas
Injun Country '68, acrylic on canvas, Moody Galleries, Houston
Midnight Cowboy '69, acrylic on canvas, collection of ISD Corp., Houston
Night Watch '67, oil on canvas, collection of Amarillo Museum of Art,  Amarillo
Top Of The Beanstalk '68, acrylic on canvas, collection of New Orleans Museum of Art, New Orleans
Mountains '72, oil on canvas, Betty Moody Gallery, Houston
Sequi-Tex Campfire '86, acrylic on canvas. Private collection
Riverbank Encounters 4, '94, acrylic on canvas. Private collection
Insert '05. Private collection
The Red Area, 1959, Oil. Private collection
Teeth, 1967 color lithograph. The Annex Galleries inventory includes works Jack Boynton
(and many others.)

References

External links

James "Jack" Boynton, Inland Lights, 1956. Auction in Artnet.com
James W. Boynton papers, 1951-1984. Archives Of American Art, Smithsonian Institution
Painter and Printmaker James “Jack” Boynton
An interview with Houston artist Jack Boynton, ("Younger Americans Painters, Solomon R. Guggenheim. Young America, Whitney Museum of American Art".) Conducted by Sarah C. Reynolds
James “Jack” Boynton, an artist, teacher and a key figure in the post-World War II
Jack Boynton fine art prices, auction results, auction images

1928 births
2010 deaths
Abstract expressionist artists
Modern artists
20th-century American painters
American male painters
21st-century American painters
Artists from Texas
Artists from New York (state)
20th-century American printmakers
People from Fort Worth, Texas
Painters from Texas
Painters from New York (state)
20th-century American male artists